The Escort is a Canadian comedy-drama film, directed by Denis Langlois and released in 1996. Described by Langlois as "a comedy of manners in the age of AIDS", the films stars Paul-Antoine Taillefer and Éric Cabana as Philippe and Jean-Marc, a gay couple whose lives are thrown into turmoil when Steve (Robin Aubert), a young man whom they erroneously believed to be a stripper when he showed up at their party, becomes embroiled in their lives in unexpected ways, while Philippe's longtime friend Christian (Patrice Coquereau), Steve's lover, struggles to come out as HIV-positive.

The film premiered at the 1996 Toronto International Film Festival.

References

External links
 
 

1996 films
Canadian comedy-drama films
Canadian LGBT-related films
LGBT-related comedy-drama films
1996 LGBT-related films
Films directed by Denis Langlois
1990s French-language films
French-language Canadian films
HIV/AIDS in Canadian films
1990s Canadian films